Nebaliopsis typica is a species of leptostracan crustacean, the only species in the genus Nebaliopsis. It is also the only species not to brood its eggs, but instead lays them directly into the water; correspondingly, there is no sexual dimorphism in Nebaliopsis.

In contrast to the other leptostracans, which are all benthic, Nebaliopsis has a wide pelagic distribution in the Southern Hemisphere, having been found off both coasts of South America, off Ghana and Côte d'Ivoire, in the south-western Indian Ocean, the south Pacific Ocean and in the Scotia Sea.

References

Leptostraca
Monotypic crustacean genera
Crustaceans described in 1887